Siahti Kalat (also Romanized as Sīāhtī Kalāt) is a village in Abtar Rural District, in the Central District of Iranshahr County, Sistan and Baluchestan Province, Iran. At the 2006 census, its population was 102, in 21 families.

References 

Populated places in Iranshahr County